TRADOC most often refers to the United States Army Training and Doctrine Command.

TRADOC may also refer to:
 Training and Doctrine Command (Albania)
 Philippine Army Training and Doctrine Command
 Singapore Armed Forces Training and Doctrine Command
 Training and Doctrine Command (Lithuania)
 Training and Doctrine Command (Nigeria)
 Malaysian Army Training and Doctrine Command